Maduranga Zoysa (born 27 September 1984, in Moratuwa, Sri Lanka) is a domestic Sri Lankan right-hand batsman and leg-break bowler currently playing for Sri Lanka Police SC. He recently also joined the Spencer Cricket Club in Surrey, England.

Zoysa and teammate Krishal Magage held the world record for the highest twenty20 wicket partnership with 64* runs. They held the title for more than four years before surrendering it to Dwayne Bravo and Jerome Taylor, who had 66 runs.

Career statistics

References

External links
 Profile at espncricinfo.com

1984 births
Living people
Sri Lankan cricketers
Saracens Sports Club cricketers
Singha Sports Club cricketers
Burgher Recreation Club cricketers
Ratnapura District cricketers